Qian Hong (born January 30, 1971, in Baoding, Hebei) is a former butterfly swimmer from China and two-time Olympic medalist. Qian first won a bronze medal in the 100 m butterfly at the 1988 Summer Olympics in Seoul, South Korea. Four years later she captured gold in the same event at the 1992 Summer Olympics in Barcelona, Spain.

References
 databaseOlympics

1971 births
Living people
Olympic bronze medalists for China
Olympic gold medalists for China
Olympic swimmers of China
Sportspeople from Baoding
Swimmers at the 1988 Summer Olympics
Swimmers at the 1992 Summer Olympics
Olympic bronze medalists in swimming
Chinese female butterfly swimmers
World Aquatics Championships medalists in swimming
Swimmers from Hebei
Asian Games medalists in swimming
Swimmers at the 1986 Asian Games
Swimmers at the 1990 Asian Games
Medalists at the 1992 Summer Olympics
Medalists at the 1988 Summer Olympics
Olympic gold medalists in swimming
Universiade medalists in swimming
Asian Games gold medalists for China
Asian Games silver medalists for China
Medalists at the 1986 Asian Games
Medalists at the 1990 Asian Games
Universiade silver medalists for China
Medalists at the 1991 Summer Universiade